Derenbach is a small town in the commune of Wincrange, in northern Luxembourg.  , the town has a population of 268.

Towns in Luxembourg
Wincrange